Fritz Roessel (born 5 February 1937) is a Dutch chess player.

Biography
From the late 1950s to the mid-1960s, Fritz Roessel was one of the leading new generation chess players in the Netherlands. In 1953, in Copenhagen he played in 2nd World Junior Chess Championship and ranked in 11th place (3rd in Final B). In 1955, Fritz Roessel won 1st Dutch Open Chess Championship.

Fritz Roessel played for Netherlands in the Chess Olympiad:
 In 1958, at second reserve board in the 13th Chess Olympiad in Munich (+6, =3, -2).

Fritz Roessel played for Netherlands in the European Team Chess Championship preliminaries:
 In 1965, at fourth board in the 3rd European Team Chess Championship preliminaries (+2, =0, -0).

Fritz Roessel played for Netherlands in the World Student Team Chess Championships:
 In 1955, at second board in the 2nd World Student Team Chess Championship in Lyon (+4, =2, -3),
 In 1958, at first board in the 5th World Student Team Chess Championship in Varna (+5, =1, -4),
 In 1961, at second board in the 8th World Student Team Chess Championship in Helsinki (+4, =7, -1),
 In 1963, at third board in the 10th World Student Team Chess Championship in Budva (+5, =5, -2).

Fritz Roessel played for Netherlands in the Clare Benedict Chess Cup:
 In 1957, at fourth board in the 4th Clare Benedict Chess Cup in Bern (+3, =1, -1) and won team silver medal,
 In 1961, at second board in the 8th Clare Benedict Chess Cup in Neuhausen (+1, =3, -1).

References

External links

Fritz Roessel chess games at 365chess.com

1937 births
Living people
Dutch chess players
Chess Olympiad competitors
20th-century chess players